Thachampara (also spelled Thachampara) is a village in the Palakkad district of Kerala, India. It is administered by the Tachampara gram panchayat.

Demographics
 India census, Tachampara had a population of 12,774 with 6,141 males and 6,633 females.

References 

Villages in Palakkad district